The Man With 80 Wives is a British documentary that aired on Channel 4 on 19 July 2006. It featured journalist Sanjiv Bhattacharya, trying to find the whereabouts of the Fundamentalist Church of Jesus Christ of Latter-Day Saints leader, Warren Jeffs.

References

External links
 
Channel4.com

2006 television films
2006 films
British television films
British television documentaries
Documentary films critical of the Fundamentalist Church of Jesus Christ of Latter-Day Saints
2006 in Christianity
2000s British films